The First Lady of Djibouti is the spouse of the president of Djibouti. The present first lady is Kadra Mahamoud Haid, wife of President Ismaïl Omar Guelleh. Guelleh assumed office on 8 May 1999.

Haid holds considerable influence in Djiboutian national politics. According to Africa Intelligence magazine, Kadra Mahamoud Haid serves as Djibouti's de facto vice president within her husband's government.

First ladies of Djibouti

References

 
Djibouti
Djiboutian women in politics